Paropsis charybdis, commonly known as the Eucalyptus tortoise beetle, is a species of leaf beetle belonging to the genus Paropsis. It is considered a pest of some species of Eucalyptus.

Description
Paropsis charybdis is identified by its pale creamy-white elytra upon which are three broad transverse areas of darker colouration. The under surface is yellow-brown.

Distribution
Paropsis charybdis is native to Australia, but has spread to nearby New Zealand.

Behaviour and ecology

Parasites
The parasitoid wasps Ennogera nassaui and Eadya paropsidis have been used as a biological control agent for P. charybdis.

Relationship to humans

As pests
Paropsis charybdis is the most serious defoliater of eucalyptus in New Zealand and is particularly associated with the subgenus Symphyomyrtus. The most severely attacked species include: E. globulus, E. viminalis, E. johnstonii, E. smithii, E. grandis, E. deanei, E. guilfoylei, E. macarthurii, E. longifolia, and E. quadrangulata.

References

Chrysomelinae
Beetles described in 1860
Pest insects
Beetles of Australia
Taxa named by Carl Stål